The Danto River or Río Danto is a river whose mouth comes out on the western side of La Ceiba, Honduras.

See also 
 List of rivers of Honduras

References 

Rivers of Honduras